"Dancing in My Head" is a song by American recording artist Eric Turner. Originally co-written and produced by frequent production partner Eshraque "iSHi" Mughal, the song featured Swedish DJ Avicii (while also using his alias Tom Hangs). His two remixes are known as the "Avicii's Been Cursed" Mix (the club mix version) and the Tom Hangs Remix (the radio edit version). Both remixes were released as individual downloadable tracks. A music video was made for the Tom Hangs remix (the intro uses a portion of the Avicii's Been Cursed Mix), and lyric videos were also made for both remixes. All of the videos were published to YouTube through Eric Turner's Vevo channel, including a behind-the-scenes video for the music video. The song reached number 188 in the UK.

Track listing
All songs written and composed by Eric Turner and Eshraque "iSHi" Mughal.

Charts

References

External links
 

2012 songs
2012 singles
Capitol Records singles
Songs written by Eshraque "iSHi" Mughal
Songs written by Avicii
Songs written by Eric Turner (singer)